The WAGC-3, also known as WAG-10, is a class of 25 kv AC electric locomotive rebuilt by Banaras Locomotive Works (BLW). It can deliver 10,000 hp (7.457 kW). The locomotive was rebuilt from a WDG-3A diesel locomotive. The name stands for broad gauge (W), alternating current (A), goods service (G), converted (C).

Locomotive shed

See also
Locomotives of India
Indian Railways
Rail transport in India

References

Bibliography

Electric locomotives of India
25 kV AC locomotives
Banaras Locomotive Works locomotives
Co-Co locomotives
Railway locomotives introduced in 2018
5 ft 6 in gauge locomotives